Channel 4 was a free-to-air digital channel. It was only available in Sydney, Australia.

Channel 4 was an electronic program guide that listed ABC, Channel Seven, Channel Nine, Channel Ten and SBS. It showed what was on each channel, then changed to what was coming up next. For example, the station logo, time the program started, and classifications were shown. At the bottom of the screen, was a list of primetime programming for each station plus ABC2 and Digital Channel 44. ABC2 and ABC1 alternate in the same row in the now/next section.

Digital terrestrial television in Australia
Television channels and stations established in 2008
Television channels and stations disestablished in 2010
Defunct television channels in Australia
Digital Forty Four